The Battle of Aliaga was fought on September 4–5, 1897, between the Philippine revolutionaries of Nueva Ecija and the Spanish forces of Governor General Primo de Rivera. It is often described as one of the "most glorious battles" of the Philippine Revolutionary War.

Background 
With his forces evacuating out of Cavite, Aguinaldo and his forces retreated to Puray, Montalban, winning a battle there and eventually found his way to central Luzon. He and his forces then relocated the revolutionary capital at Biak-na-Bato, San Miguel, Bulacan in June 24, 1897. From there, he exercised his authority as the revolutionary president of the Republica Filipina and sent letters to all islands in the Philippine islands encouraging the natives to rise up against Spain.

On August 27, 1897, Gen. Mamerto Natividad and Col. Manuel Tinio conducted raids in Carmen, Zaragoza and Peñaranda, Nueva Ecija. Three days later, on the 30th, they stormed and captured Santor (now Bongabon) with the help of the townspeople. They stayed in that town till September 3.

Prelude
Although the Filipino revolutionary army was reconstituted and reorganized after much effort by the revolutionary leadership at Biak-na-Bato, the issue of food and ammunition remained rampant. Hence, Aguinaldo issued orders to the subordinate commanders to assault several towns in Bulacan and Nueva Ecija, for the purpose of acquiring provisions for the war effort. One of such towns was Aliaga in Nueva Ecija.

The battle 
On September 4, with the principal objective of acquiring provisions lacking in Biac-na-Bato, Gen. Natividad and Col. Manuel Tinio united their forces with those of Col. Casimiro Tinio, Gen. Pio del Pilar, Col. Jose Paua and Eduardo Llanera for a dawn attack on Aliaga. (Casimiro Tinio, popularly known as ‘Capitan Berong', was an elder brother of Manuel through his father's first marriage.) The following morning was described as "The most glorious battle of the rebellion". The rebel forces, numbering about between 4,000-5,000 men, took the church and convent, the Casa Tribunal and other government buildings. The commander of the Spanish detachment died in the first moments of fighting, while those who survived were locked up in the thick-walled jail. The rebels then proceeded to entrench themselves and fortify several houses. The following day, Sunday the 5th, the church and convent as well as a group of houses were put to the torch due to exigencies of defense.

Spanish counterattack 
Alarmed by these sudden attacks, Governor General Primo de Rivera fielded 8,000 men under the command of Gen. Ricardo Monet and Gen. Nuñez. The latter commanded a column of reinforcements that arrived in the afternoon of the 6th, they were met with such a tremendous hail of bullets that the general, two captains and many soldiers were wounded, forcing the Spaniards to retreat a kilometer away from the town to await the arrival of Gen. Monet and his men. Even with the reinforcements, the Spaniards were overcautious in attacking the rebels there, and halted their attack for the rest of the day. The Filipinos held the town of Aliaga for the rest of the day up into the night of September 5.

Aftermath
The Spanish decided to assault the next day on the noon of September 6 but when they arrived, they found the town abandoned, the rebels had already gone back to Biak-na-Bato by midnight, having scored a tactical victory and gained the supplies and ammunition they needed. Filipino casualties numbered 8 dead and 10 wounded, while the Spaniards record multiple dead and even more wounded. Tinio and the other generals shifted to guerrilla warfare in October the same year.

See also 
Battle of Binakayan
Retreat to Montalban
Cry of Nueva Ecija

References 

Battles of the Philippine Revolution
History of Nueva Ecija